Mohammad Fayek Uzzaman is a Bangladeshi academic and a former Vice Chancellor of Khulna University. Now he is working as a professor of Department of Islamic History and Culture in University of Rajshahi. His Ph.D. is on the topic of Liberation War of Bangladesh and Mujibanagar Sarkar.

Career
Zaman served as the pro-vice-chancellor of Khulna University from 28 November 2010. Earlier he served as a professor of Islamic History and Cultural Department of Rajshahi University.

In January 2013, Zaman was appointed as the vice-chancellor of Khulna University. He was appointed for the second term in January 2017. His second tenure ended on 28 January 2021.

Works 
Mohammad Fayek Uzzaman's first book was on the Iran-Iraq War named ইরান ইরাক বিরোধ ও সাম্প্রতিক যুদ্ধ (Iran-Iraq Birodh O Shamprotik Juddho), later republished as ইরান ইরাক যুদ্ধ ( Iran-Iraq War). His PhD thesis was later published named মুজিবনগর সরকার ও বাংলাদেশের মুক্তিযুদ্ধ( Mujibnagar Sarkar O Bangladesher Muktijuddho). His third book was on Sectarianism, Terrorism and reflecting past history of Bangladesh, from 1952 to 1975. The book was named সাম্প্রদায়িকতা থেকে জঙ্গিবাদ: ভাষা আন্দোলন, মুক্তিযুদ্ধ ও বঙ্গবন্ধু হত্যাকাণ্ড( Shamprodayikota Theke Jongibad: Bhasha Andolon, Muktijuddho O Bongobondhu Hottyakando) Two Collection of columns were published in 2019 named শেখ মুজিব : মেঠোপথের বংশীবাদক( Sheikh Mujib: Methopother Bongshibadok) and আপনিইতো বাংলাদেশ( Apnie To Bangladesh).

References

Living people
Academic staff of the University of Rajshahi
Vice-Chancellors of Khulna University
Place of birth missing (living people)
Year of birth missing (living people)